Istiblennius muelleri, Mueller's rockskipper, is a species of combtooth blenny found in the western Pacific ocean. Males of this species can reach a maximum of  SL, while females can reach a maximum of  SL. The specific zoology honours the German-Australian physician, geographer, and botanist Ferdinand von Mueller (1825-1896).

References

muelleri
Fish described in 1879
Taxa named by Carl Benjamin Klunzinger